Jingsheng Jason Cong (born 1963 in Beijing) is a Chinese-born American computer scientist, educator, and serial entrepreneur. He received his B.S. degree in computer science from Peking University in 1985, his M.S. and Ph. D. degrees in computer science from the University of Illinois at Urbana-Champaign in 1987 and 1990, respectively. He has been on the faculty in the Computer Science Department at the University of California, Los Angeles (UCLA) since 1990. Currently, he is a Distinguished Chancellor’s Professor and the director of Center for Domain-Specific Computing (CDSC).

Research contributions and commercial impact
Cong made fundamental contributions to the FPGA synthesis technology. His  result in the early 1990s on depth-optimal mapping (FlowMap) for lookup-table based FPGAs is a cornerstone of all FPGA logic synthesis tools used today. This, together with the subsequent works on the cut-enumeration and Boolean matching based methods for FPGA mapping, led to a successful startup company Aplus Design Technologies (1998-2003) founded by Cong. Aplus developed the first commercially available FPGA architecture evaluation tool and physical synthesis tool, which were OEMed by most FPGA companies and distributed to tens of thousands of FPGA designers worldwide. Aplus was acquired by Magma Design Automation in 2003, which is now part of Synopsys.

Cong’s research also made significant impact on high-level synthesis (HLS) for integrated circuits. The decade-long research in 2000s by his group led to another UCLA spin-off, AutoESL Design Automation (2006-2011), co-founded by Cong. AutoESL developed most widely used HLS tool for FPGAs and was acquired by Xilinx in 2011. The HLS tool from AutoESL (renamed as Vivado HLS after Xilinx acquisition) allows FPGA designers to use C/C++ software programming languages instead of hardware description languages for FPGA design and implementation.

In 2009, Cong led a group of twelve faculty members from UCLA, Rice, Ohio-State, and UC Santa Barbara and won a highly competitive NSF Expeditions in Computing Award on Customizable Domain-Specific Computing (CDSC).

Cong’s  research on interconnect-centric design for integrated circuits plays a significant role in overcoming the timing closure challenge in deep submicron designs in 1990s. His work on VLSI interconnect planning, synthesis, and layout optimization as well as highly scalable multi-level analytical circuit placement are embedded in the core of all physical synthesis tools developed by the EDA industry. The best-known industry adoption example was Magma Design Automation, which was founded in 1997 aiming at achieving timing closure through physical synthesis. Cong served on its Technical Advisory Board since its inception until its IPO, and later as its Chief Technology Advisor from 2003 to 2008. Magma was acquired by Synopsys in 2012.

Selected awards
Cong's work on FlowMap received the 2011 ACM/IEEE A. Richard Newton Technical Impact Award in Electric Design Automation "for pioneering work on technology mapping for FPGA that has made significant impact to the FPGA research community and industry", and was the first inducted to the FPGA and Reconfigurable Computing Hall of Fame by ACM TCFPGA.

Cong was elected to IEEE Fellow in 2000 "for seminal contributions in computer-aided design of integrated circuits, especially in physical design automation, interconnect optimization, and synthesis of FPGAs", and ACM Fellow in 2008 "for contributions to electronic design automation".

He received the 2010 IEEE Circuits and System (CAS) Society Technical Achievement Award "For seminal contributions to electronic design automation, especially in FPGA synthesis, VLSI interconnect optimization, and physical design automation", and also the 2016 IEEE Computer Society Technical Achievement Award "For setting the algorithmic foundations for high-level synthesis of field programmable gate arrays". He is the only one who received a Technical Achievement Award from both the IEEE Circuits and Systems Society and the Computer Society.

In February 2017, Cong was elected as a member in National Academy of Engineering. He was elected a foreign member of the Chinese Academy of Engineering in 2019.

References

External links

1963 births
Living people
University of California, Los Angeles faculty
Fellows of the Association for Computing Machinery
Fellow Members of the IEEE
Peking University alumni
Grainger College of Engineering alumni
Members of the United States National Academy of Engineering
Scientists from Beijing
Chinese computer scientists
American computer scientists
Businesspeople from Beijing
Chinese computer businesspeople
American computer businesspeople
Chinese emigrants to the United States
Foreign members of the Chinese Academy of Engineering